SMK Bhakti Anindya vocational school is a vocational high school in Tangerang Municipality. The number of students is around 1000.

History 
Widya Education Foundation Anindya, better known as the LEPISI was founded on November 10, 1987. Anindya Widya Education Foundation manages the High School of Economics (STIE) BISMA LEPISI, High School Foreign Language (STBA) LEPISI Honor, the Academy of Psychology and Management (AKSEMA) LEPISI, LePreston Unistate, STMIK Insan LEPISI Development and Vocational High School (SMK) Bhakti Anindya.

Extracurricular activities include sports, gymnastics, music and theater.

Programs 
SMK Bhakti Anindya has four major programs:

Office Administration Program  
The program gives participants the skills of financial administration and computer ability.

Accounting Program 
The program gives participants skills in accounting, managing financial transaction, and tax.

Multimedia Programs 
The program gives students skills in software, peripherals, multimedia, graphic design, web design, animation, audio-video.

Program Computer Engineering and Networks 
The program equips learners with the skills of networking installations, operating system network, network configuration, and personal computer assembly.

Infrastructure 
 Classrooms and laboratories are air-conditioned 
 Lab Computers 
 Lab Accounting 
 Lab Multimedia 
 Lab Office and Office Equipment 
 Lab Computer Engineering and Networks 
 Studio Music and Photographic 
 Library 
 Sports Facilities 
 Job market 
 Space/Multipurpose Hall 
 Cafeteria and Cafe 
 Means of Worship
 Lab Typing 
Gymnasium
 Hall 
 Copy, printing and stationery stores 
 Radio

References 

Schools in Indonesia
Education in Banten